The following is a list of recipients of the Paralympic Order.

The Paralympic Order is the highest award of the Paralympic Movement, since 1994. The recipients get a medal with the IPC logo on it. The Paralympic Order is awarded to individuals for particularly distinguished contribution to the Paralympic Movement.

Before 2003, the Paralympic Order was given out in three categories: Gold, Silver and Bronze.

Recipients

1990s

2000s

2010s

2020s

See also
List of recipients of the Olympic Order

References

Paralympic Order
Paralympics-related lists
Paralympic Order
 
Paralympic symbols